Dikshanshu Negi (born 5 October 1990) is an Indian cricketer. He made his List A debut on 27 September 2019, for Uttarakhand in the 2019–20 Vijay Hazare Trophy. He made his Twenty20 debut on 8 November 2019, for Uttarakhand in the 2019–20 Syed Mushtaq Ali Trophy. He made his first-class debut on 9 December 2019, for Uttarakhand in the 2019–20 Ranji Trophy.

References

External links
 

1990 births
Living people
Indian cricketers
Uttarakhand cricketers
Place of birth missing (living people)